Heggeli is a former subway station on the Oslo T-bane.

The station was located between Borgen and Smestad, and was opened when the Smestad Line was created, as an extension from Majorstuen to Smestad on 17 November 1912. It was closed as a part of the Røa Line overhaul in 1995.

References

Oslo Metro stations in Oslo
Railway stations opened in 1912
Railway stations closed in 1995
Disused Oslo Metro stations
1912 establishments in Norway
1995 disestablishments in Norway